The white-headed babbler or Cretzschmar's babbler (Turdoides leucocephala) is a species of bird in the family Leiothrichidae.
It is found in Eritrea, Ethiopia, and Sudan.
Its natural habitats are dry savanna and subtropical or tropical dry shrubland.  Its name is sometimes confused with the yellow-billed babbler, which is alternatively called the white-headed babbler.

The name commemorates the German physician and scientist Philipp Jakob Cretzschmar who founded the Senckenberg Natural History Museum.

References

Collar, N. J. & Robson, C. 2007. Family Timaliidae (Babblers)  pp. 70 – 291 in; del Hoyo, J., Elliott, A. & Christie, D.A. eds. Handbook of the Birds of the World, Vol. 12. Picathartes to Tits and Chickadees. Lynx Edicions, Barcelona.

white-headed babbler
Birds of East Africa
white-headed babbler
Taxonomy articles created by Polbot
white-headed babbler